Anatoly (Otto) Alekseyevich Solonitsyn (30 August 1934 – 11 June 1982) was a Soviet actor known for his roles in Andrei Tarkovsky's films. He won the Silver Bear for Best Actor at the 31st Berlin International Film Festival.

Film career
Solonitsyn was born in Bogorodsk. At birth, he was named Otto, after polar explorer Otto Schmidt. 

His debut in cinema was in the Sverdlovsk Film Studio's short film The Case of Kurt Clausewitz (1963), directed by Gleb Panfilov. Solonitsyn is best known in the west for his roles in several of Andrei Tarkovsky's films, including Dr. Sartorius in Solaris (1972), the Writer in Stalker (1979), the physician in Mirror (1975), and the title role in Andrei Rublev (1966).

In his book Sculpting in Time, Tarkovsky calls him his favorite actor, and writes that Solonitsyn was intended to play the lead roles in each of his films Nostalghia (1983) and The Sacrifice (1986), but the actor died before their production. Tarkovsky admired Solonitsyn's ability to fully embody the ideas of the director. When Tarkovsky was considering making a film adaptation of Dostoevsky's famous novel The Idiot, Solonitsyn was even ready to do the plastic surgery to look more like the great Russian writer.

In the former Soviet Union he is also well known for his roles in At Home Among Strangers (1974), The Train Has Stopped (1982), and many others.

Awards
In 1981, he won the Silver Bear for Best Actor at the 31st Berlin International Film Festival for his role in Aleksandr Zarkhi's film Twenty Six Days from the Life of Dostoyevsky. The same year, he was given the title of Honored Artist of the RSFSR.

Death
Solonitsyn died from lung cancer in 1982, at the age of 47. Allegedly, according to Viktor Sharun, the sound editor on Stalker, Solonitsyn, Tarkovsky and Larisa Tarkovskaya became ill due to exposure to toxic chemicals during filming on the location of the movie.

Filmography

References

External links
 

1934 births
1982 deaths
20th-century Russian male actors
People from Bogorodsky District, Nizhny Novgorod Oblast
Honored Artists of the RSFSR
Silver Bear for Best Actor winners
Russian male film actors
Russian male stage actors

Russian male television actors
Soviet male film actors
Soviet male stage actors
Soviet male television actors
Deaths from lung cancer in Russia
Deaths from lung cancer in the Soviet Union
Burials at Vagankovo Cemetery